Yayuncun Subdistrict, or Asian Games Village Subdistrict, is the site of the 1990 Asian Games, a major residential area and a subdistrict of the Chaoyang District of Beijing.

Overview 
Yayuncun originally referred to a series of residential high-rises and facilities built near Auhui Bridge to accommodate athletes participating in the 1990 Asian Games. It was built simultaneously with the Olympic Sports Center, both designed by Beijing Institute of Architectural Design.

After the Asian Games, Yayuncun gradually developed into a high-end residential area, with numerous buildings including the Olympic Sports Center, Beijing International Conventions Center, Beijing North Star Continental Grand Hotel, Beijing North Star Shopping Center, Celebrity International Grand Hotel, Yuanda Center, and Yan Huang Art Museum. The Fourth World Conference on Women was also held in Yayuncun. The 4th Ring Road crosses the southern proportion of the area.

Beijing National Stadium, Beijing National Aquatics Center, and the Olympic Park, venues for the 2008 Beijing Olympics, are located west of Yayuncun.

History

Administrative Divisions 

At the end of 2021, there are a total of 13 communities within the subdistrict:

Landmarks 
 China Ethnic Museum
 Olympic Sports Center
 Yuan Dadu City Wall Ruins Park

See also
List of township-level divisions of Beijing

References

External link

Chaoyang District, Beijing
Subdistricts of Beijing
Neighbourhoods of Beijing
1990 Asian Games